Eric John Kipping (March 16, 1925 – October 24, 2017) was a Canadian politician. He served in the Legislative Assembly of New Brunswick from 1978 to 1987, as a Progressive Conservative member for the constituency of Saint John North.

References

Progressive Conservative Party of New Brunswick MLAs
1925 births
2017 deaths